The Fujifilm X-T20 is a mirrorless interchangeable-lens camera announced by Fujifilm on January 19, 2017. The X-T20 is a successor to the X-T10, which was released in 2015, with a number of iterative refinements and enhancements over it.

The X-T30 succeeds the X-T20. The new camera was announced on February 14, 2019.

Differences from the X-T10
 24.3 MGPX
 More focus points
 X-Trans CMOS III
 X-Processor Pro image processor
 Improved autofocus performance
 4K video recording at 30 fps
 Acros film simulation
 A touchscreen with focus point selection

References

X-T20
Cameras introduced in 2017